Destroying the exception may refer to:
 Accident (fallacy), fallacy when an exception to a rule of thumb is ignored
 Converse accident, fallacy when a rule that applies only to an exceptional case is wrongly applied to all cases in general